August Arras (27 June 1881 Erastvere Parish (now Kanepi Parish), Kreis Werro – 24 March 1968 Stockholm) was an Estonian politician. He was a member of Estonian Constituent Assembly, representing the Estonian Labour Party. On 16 October 1919, he resigned his post and he was replaced by Theodor Käärik.

References

1881 births
1968 deaths
People from Kanepi Parish
People from Kreis Werro
Estonian Labour Party politicians
Members of the Estonian Constituent Assembly
Estonian World War II refugees
Estonian emigrants to Sweden